One Dag Hammarskjöld Plaza is a skyscraper located at 885 Second Avenue in Midtown Manhattan, New York City. It is a 628 ft (191 m) tall skyscraper.  It was designed by Emery Roth and developed by Lawrence Ruben. Named for Dag Hammarskjöld, it was completed in 1972 and has 49 floors. It has 750,000 square feet of floor area and is the 102nd tallest building in New York

Its main usage is office space. Denmark, Turkey, Canada, France, Italy, the United Kingdom, Spain, Chile, Belgium, Ireland, Austria and Sweden all have their permanent missions to the United Nations located in this building, while Norway and Belgium have consulates there. Communications company Dell Publishing is also a tenant. It is owned by Rockpoint Group, who bought the building from the Ruben Companies in 2018 for $600 million. Andy Warhol's Factory stood on the site (on 47th St) from 1963 to 1967.

See also
List of tallest buildings in New York City

References

External links
Skyscraperpage
Dag Hammarskjold Tower
Hammarskjold Tower Plaza

1 Dag Hammarskjold Plaza
Headquarters of the United Nations
Turtle Bay, Manhattan
Privately owned public spaces
Second Avenue (Manhattan)
Office buildings completed in 1972
1972 establishments in New York City